Joseph Pearson Caldwell (March 5, 1808 – June 30, 1853) was a Congressional Representative from North Carolina; born near Olin, North Carolina, March 5, 1808; attended Bethany Academy, near Statesville, North Carolina; studied law; was admitted to the bar and commenced practice in Statesville, N.C.; served in the State senate in 1833 and 1834; member of the State house of commons 1838–1844; elected as a Whig to the Thirty-first and Thirty-second Congresses (March 4, 1849 – March 3, 1853); was not a candidate for renomination in 1852; died in Statesville, N.C., June 30, 1853; interment in Old Statesville Cemetery.

His son, Joseph Pearson Caldwell, Jr. (18531911, more commonly referred to as J.P. Caldwell), was the editor of the Landmark newspaper in Statesville, North Carolina.

See also 
 Thirty-second United States Congress
 Thirty-first United States Congress

References

External links 
U.S. Congressional Biographical Directory

Caldwell, John T.
Caldwell, John T.
Members of the North Carolina House of Representatives
Caldwell, John T.
Whig Party members of the United States House of Representatives from North Carolina
19th-century American politicians